Two vessels of the Royal Navy has borne the name HMS St Lucia or HMS Saint Lucia, while another was planned:

  was a 14-gun gun-brig, previously the French Navy schooner Enfant Prodigue.  captured her in 1803, but French privateers recaptured her in 1807.
She was laid down in 1945 but was canceled later that year.

Royal Navy ship names